16 warm-up matches were played between 12 and 19 March featuring all 16 teams.

Fixtures

See also
 2014 ICC World Twenty20

References

External links
 Official 2014 ICC World Twenty20 site

warm-up

bn:২০১৬ আইসিসি বিশ্ব টুয়েন্টি২০ প্রস্তুতিমূলক খেলা